Abhijeet Bhattacharya (born 30 October 1958), better known as Abhijeet, is a Bollywood playback singer. Abhijeet has sung 6034 songs in over 1000 films.

Personal life 
Abhijeet was born to a Kanpur-based Bengali businessman turned editor Dhirendranath Bhattacharya, and his wife Kamladevi Bhattacharya in Kanpur, Uttar Pradesh.

Career
Abhijeet left home after graduation from the Christ Church College in Kanpur for Mumbai in 1981 to pursue a career in singing in Bollywood. He has been influenced by the singer Kishore Kumar.

He has sung many Hindi songs. His songs include work from the film Baaghi, composed by Anand–Milind. The songs Ek Chanchal Shokh Hasina, Chandni Raat Hai and Har Kasam Se Badi Hai were featured in this movie. This was followed by several chartbusters from movies such as Khiladi and Shola Aur Shabnam, both of which were also box office hits. Then in 1994, he performed for movies such as Yeh Dillagi, Phool Aur Angaar, Anjaam, Raja Babu and Main Khiladi Tu Anari. In 1997, he won the Filmfare Best Playback Singer Award for the song Main Koi Aisi Geet Gaoon from Yes Boss. Other movies he sang in include Baadshah, Dilwale Dulhaniya Le Jayenge, Rakshak, Anjaam, Darr, Josh, Dhadkan, Raaz, Phir Bhi Dil Hai Hindustani, Khoobsurat, Khiladi, Tum Bin, Dillagi, Chalte Chalte, and Main Hoon Na among many others.

Abhijeet voiced a number of songs picturized on Shah Rukh Khan in his films which include but not limited to Asoka, Duplicate and Om Shanti Om. However, due to the disappointment of being listed last of the singers in the end credits of Main Hoon Na and again in Om Shanti Om, they parted ways. Abhijeet last sang for Shah Rukh Khan in the movie Billu Barber for the song Khudaya Khair which was their last collaboration. The song was not picturized because of Abhijeet's insistence on not filming his version of the song. Therefore, another version was created for picturization.

In May 2018, he has sung the title song of Bhaijaan Elo Re starring Dhallywood King Shakib Khan. After 5 years of self-imposed exile, in 2018 he came back with back to back chartbusters with Bengali Superstars. He sang the Title track of Bhaijaan Elo Re with Shakib Khan and Sujon Majhi Re from Hoichoi Unlimited with Dev. Also, he sang for new age Music Composer Vishal Mishra who composed the song Aye Zindagi where the music video featured Siddhant Gupta. Abhijeet also sang Joy Durga Maa composed by Jeet Ganguli which is a duet with Shaan. The video featured former Indian Cricket Captain Sourav Ganguly and Tollywood Star Mimi, Nusrat and Shubhasree. In May 2019, Abhijeet Released Chakde Fatte which is the Cricket World Cup Song for 2019. The song is well appreciated by listeners. Many of his iconic songs are now being remade by new age composers, such as Tan Tana Tan  for Judwaa 2 and Sheher Ki Ladki  for Khandaani Shafakhana. In 2020 his first released song came for the Movie Shukranu, a 70s feel like song "Khwaab hai ya haqeqaat" duet with Indian Idol fame Krishnakali Saha released from Zee Music Company. Currently in September 2021 Abhijeet is Judging 'Sangeet er Moha Juddho', a reality show airing on Colours Bangla Channel along with other judges like Jeet Ganguli, Ustad Rashid Khan and Lopamudra Mitra. His latest release in 2022 is a song from Film Super Dhamaal.com starring  Rajpal Yadav  released from Zee Music Company.

Non-Film Music:

Abhijeet has recorded many non-film pop music Albums. He released two albums, Main Deewana Hoon and Tapori No.1 in the early 1990s. Later he launched Aashiqui. He released a pop album, called Tere Bina in (2003). He got MTV Music Asia Award for that Album.

Social media presence
On 6 May 2015, when sessions court in Mumbai sentenced actor Salman Khan to five years in jail in connection with the 2002 hit-and-run case, Abhijeet came out in support of Salman by tweeting "Roads are meant for cars and dogs, not for people sleeping on them". This raised anger among several Twitter users as well as in popular media for making insensitive remarks as well as opening himself to criticism by members of media or others that Abhijeet is equating homeless people with dogs.

In a similar tweet, he said "Kutta rd pe soyega kutte ki maut marega, roads garib ke baap ki nahi hai I ws homles an year nvr slept on rd" (Dogs sleep on the road and die like dogs. Roads are not ancestral properties of poor. I was homeless for a year and never slept on roads). Abhijeet clarified to a news channel, "Nobody should die on the roads as dogs". He further stated that the death of the poor man was a loss to his family members and by not sleeping on the roads such deaths can be and should be avoided. He said and so did other people on the same news channel program that sleeping on the roads/pavements is dangerous as the roads are extremely busy. Many members of the public and media want the government to do more to help avoid such preventable incidents. Unfortunately, a large number of people sleep overnight on the roads in cities in India due to the lack of means to buy or rent a house while they eke out a living doing menial labor.

In July 2016, Abhijeet was arrested by the Mumbai police and released later on bail, for allegedly abusing journalist Swati Chaturvedi Online on Twitter. The arrest was at the complaint of Aam Aadmi Party spokesperson Preeti Sharma Menon with Mumbai's BKC Cyber Cell. According to the Indian Express, the FIR for the online abuse was filed on charges of public obscenity and outrage of modesty.

Abhijeet Bhattacharya's Twitter account (@abhijeetsinger) was suspended on 23 May 2017, after he posted a series of 'offensive tweets', especially against women. Sonu Nigam also deleted his account after Abhijeet's account was suspended.

On 29 May, Abhijeet re-joined Twitter with a new account(@singerabhijeet). But by evening, the new account was also suspended.

Discography 

Tamil songs

Awards and nominations

Honours
 Uttar Pradesh Gaurav Samman

Filmfare Awards
Filmfare Best Male Playback Award (1998)

 Screen Award for Best Male Playback in 1998 for "Main Koi Aisa Geet" from Yes Boss<ref><g:plusone href="http://www.awardsandshows.com/features/star-screen-awards-1998-125.html"></g:plusone></ref>

References

External links
 
 Abhijeet Bhattacharya Rediff

Living people
Bengali singers
Indian male playback singers
Indian male singers
People from Kanpur
Sa Re Ga Ma Pa participants
Bollywood playback singers
Ramakrishna Mission schools alumni
1958 births
Filmfare Awards winners
Screen Awards winners